This is a list of the German Media Control Top100 Singles Chart number-ones of 1966.

See also
List of number-one hits (Germany)

References
 Ehnert, Günter (1999). HIT BILANZ Deutsche Chart Singles 1956-1980. 
 German Singles Chart archives from 1956
 Media Control Chart archives from 1960

1966 in Germany
1966 record charts
1966